Sulfuricurvum kujiense is a facultatively anaerobic, chemolithoautotrophic, sulfur-oxidizing bacterium, the type species of its genus. Its cells are motile, curved rods and have a single polar flagellum. Its type strain is YK-1T (=JCM 11577T =MBIC 06352T =ATCC BAA-921T).

References

Further reading

External links

LPSN
Type strain of Sulfuricurvum kujiense at BacDive -  the Bacterial Diversity Metadatabase

Campylobacterota